AnnaLee Saxenian is a professor and the former Dean of the UC Berkeley School of Information, known widely for her work on technology clusters and social networks in Silicon Valley. She received her BA from Williams College in 1976 and her PhD from Massachusetts Institute of Technology in 1989.

In her book Regional Advantage: Culture and Competition in Silicon Valley and Route 128 (1994), Saxenian proposes a hypothesis to explain why California's Silicon Valley was able to keep up with the fast pace of technological progress during the 1980s, while the vertically integrated firms of the Route 128 beltway fell behind.  She argues that the key was Silicon Valley's decentralized organizational form, non-proprietary standards, and tradition of cooperative exchange (sharing information and outsourcing for component parts), in opposition to hierarchical and independent industrial systems in the East Coast.

Her 2006 book, The New Argonauts: Regional Advantage in a Global Economy, explores the globalization of the technology workforce that has occurred as the "brain drain" becomes a "brain circulation" with immigrant Indian, Chinese, and Israeli professionals taking the Silicon Valley entrepreneurial model to their home countries while also maintaining connections with the US.

References

Bibliography
 Régional Advantage: Culture and Competition in Silicon Valley and Route 128 Harvard University Press, 1994, 
 The New Argonauts: Regional Advantage in a Global Economy Harvard University Press, 2007, 
 Il vantaggio competitivo dei sistemi locali nell'era della globalizzazione. Cultura e competizione nella Silicon Valley e nella Route 128 FrancoAngeli, 2002, 
 Silicon Valley's new immigrant entrepreneurs Public Policy Institute of California, 1999, 
 The Silicon Valley-Hsinchu Connection: Technical Communities and Industrial Upgrading Stanford Institute for Economic Policy Research, 1999
 Local and Global Networks of Immigrant Professionals in Silicon Valley Public Policy Instit. of CA, 2002, 
 America's New Immigrant Entrepreneurs 2012
 Regional networks and the resurgence of Silicon Valley 	Institute of Urban & Regional Development, University of California, 1989
 The Cheshire Cat's Grin: Innovation, Regional Development and the Cambridge Case Massachusetts Institute of Technology Department of Political Science, 1987
 The origins and dynamics of production networks in Silicon Valley Institute of Urban and Regional Development, University of California, 1990
 A Fugitive Success: Finland's Economic Future SITRA, 2008,

External links
 

Year of birth missing (living people)
Living people
American people of Armenian descent
University of California, Berkeley faculty
Williams College alumni